Hans Franz Nageli or Hans Franz Nägeli (1497 in Aigle – 9 January 1579 in Bern) was a Swiss politician and military leader who was a prominent force in Bern for four decades. He captained the Bernese forces in the campaigns against the forces of the bandit Gian Giacomo Medici, and the campaign in Valais during the Wars of Kappel. He also commanded the 1536 conquest of Vaud from the Savoyards, and a campaign against the Bishop of Lausanne to free François Bonivard from Chillon Castle. From 1540 to 1568 he was Bern's chief magistrate.

References

Swiss military officers
16th-century Swiss military personnel
1497 births
1579 deaths